George Handford may refer to:

George Clive Handford, bishop
George Handford (composer), English composer